This is a list of playable and boss characters from the Mortal Kombat fighting game franchise and the games in which they appear. Created by Ed Boon and John Tobias, the series depicts conflicts between various realms. Most characters fight on behalf of their realm, with the primary heroes defending Earthrealm against conquering villains from Outworld and the Netherrealm. Early installments feature the characters participating in the eponymous Mortal Kombat tournament to decide their realm's fate. In later installments, Earthrealm is often invaded by force.

A total of 77 playable fighters have been featured in the series, in addition to unplayable bosses and guest characters. Much of the franchise's mainstays were introduced during the first three games. Nearly all of the characters have been killed at a point in the story, but have rarely stayed dead.

Introduced in Mortal Kombat (1992)

Goro

Johnny Cage

Kano

Liu Kang

Raiden

Reptile

Scorpion

Shang Tsung

Sonya Blade

Sub-Zero

Introduced in Mortal Kombat II

Baraka

Jade

Jax

Kintaro
 Voiced by: Rhasaan Orange (MK 2011), Dave B. Mitchell (MKL:BOTR)

Kintaro is the sub-boss of Mortal Kombat II and a sub-boss in the 2011 reboot. He is also the penultimate boss of Shaolin Monks. A Shokan, he shares his species' four arms and imposing size, but is distinguished by his tiger-like stripes. Kintaro participates in Shao Kahn's attempt to conquer Earthrealm during the second game's tournament, in which he is defeated by Liu Kang. In the reboot, he is defeated by Kung Lao during the tournament. The reboot also establishes him as being responsible for Kabal's injuries. In the 2015 Mortal Kombat X prequel comic, Kintaro is slain by Sonya Blade while she is under Havik's control. 

The character was a stop-motion clay figure whose design was inspired by the Japanese mythological character Kintarō. He was initially conceived for MKII as an anthropomorphic fur-lined bipedal tiger, but the concept was scrapped due to the difficulty of creating such a complicated outfit. According to series co-creator John Tobias, Kintaro was redesigned as a "Goro spinoff" who was possibly a Shokan general, but not royalty.

Kintaro appears in the animated film Mortal Kombat Legends: Battle of the Realms, voiced by Dave B. Mitchell.

Kintaro has received a middling reception due to his minor role in the series and is often unfavorably compared to previous sub-boss Goro. UGO Networks opined in 2012 that Kintaro "serves no real purpose except for being a reskinned Goro whose sole purpose is to avenge the aforementioned's death" in the conclusion of the original game. Den of Geek wrote that he "has virtually no story to speak of outside of the [MK9] retcon". Despite this, his "Reverse Rip" finishing move in the reboot was ranked ninth in Gameranx's 2012 selection of the MK series' ten most gruesome Fatalities, and Prima Games placed it 35th in their 2014 list of the series' top fifty Fatalities.

Kitana

Kung Lao

Mileena

Noob Saibot

Shao Kahn

Smoke

Introduced in Mortal Kombat 3 and updates

Chameleon
 Portrayed by: John Turk (MKT)
 Voiced by: Ed Boon (MKT)

Chameleon is a mysterious warrior who possesses the abilities of all the franchise' male ninjas. He is distinguished by his partially transparent appearance and an outfit that constantly changes its colors. Chameleon appeared in the PlayStation, Sega Saturn, and PC versions of Mortal Kombat Trilogy with no biography or ending; he is instead only referred to as "one of Shao Kahn's deadliest warriors". His Armageddon ending is also vague, revealing only that he had sought to become Mortal Kombat champion since the events of the first game.

The character was ranked 32nd in UGO's 2012 selection of the top fifty series characters, who wrote "They say copying is a form of flattery, so Chameleon makes our list." Complex rated him tenth in their 2011 selection of the series' ten "most underrated characters", but IGN'''s Mitchell Saltzman listed Chameleon and Khameleon as two of the worst Mortal Kombat characters. "Unlike all of the other ninja palette swaps that eventually gained their own identity and playstyle, both Chameleons ... feel more like gimmicks than anything."

Cyrax
Portrayed by: Sal Divita (MK3, UMK3); Shane Warren Jones (Legacy)
Voiced by: Rhasaan Orange (MK9); Ike Amadi (MK11); Artt Butler (MKL:BOTR)
Cyrax debuts in Mortal Kombat 3 as a member of the Lin Kuei clan of assassins along with Sub-Zero, Sektor, and Smoke. When the clan decide to utilize modern technology by converting its members into soulless cyborgs, Sub-Zero refuses and defects, which leads to the clan's grandmasters marking him for death. As a result, Cyrax, along with Sektor, and Smoke, are assigned to hunt down and kill him. However, during Outworld emperor Shao Kahn's invasion of Earthrealm, Sub-Zero captures Cyrax and reprograms him with orders to destroy the emperor, but Shao Kahn is defeated beforehand by the other Earthrealm warriors. In Mortal Kombat Gold (2000), after Shinnok's defeat, Cyrax experiences flashbacks of his former life, and Sonya and Jax bring him to the Outer World Investigation Agency (OIA) headquarters, where they restore his humanity. As a token of gratitude, Cyrax joins the agency as an Earthrealm scout.

In Deadly Alliance, Cyrax encounters the vampire Nitara, who offers to help him return home in exchange for his assistance in finding the egg of the Dragon King. Cyrax submerges himself in a lake of molten lava and discovers the orb that would separate her home realm from Outworld. In exchange for the egg, she honors her promise to Cyrax and sends him back to Earthrealm.

In the Mortal Kombat reboot, Cyrax is introduced during the Shaolin Tournament as a human Tswana member of the Lin Kuei who relies on his chi rather than brute force to carry out clan missions, and is against the Lin Kuei's impending "Cyber Initiative" as he is reluctant to surrender his humanity. However, during the events of the second game, he is nonetheless captured by the clan and transformed offscreen. After capturing Sub-Zero in Shao Kahn's arena during the second tournament and taking him away to be cyberized, Cyrax and Sektor pledging their services to Kahn in exchange. When the Outworld emperor launches an invasion of Earthrealm, the cyborgs attack the Earthrealm defenders to stop them from interfering, only to be thwarted by Nightwolf. Despite this, Shao Kahn's wife, Queen Sindel, arrives moments later and completes the cyborgs' mission.

Cyrax returns in Mortal Kombat 11 as a non-playable character brought to the present timeline by Kronika as part of her plan to restart time by taking part in Sektor's plot to capture Sub-Zero's Lin Kuei warriors and convert them into cyborgs to bolster her ranks. He attempts to stop Sub-Zero and Scorpion infiltrating the Cyber Lin Kuei factory to shut them down, but is defeated and his slave protocol disabled. Upon regaining his humanity, Cyrax is horrified to discover that he has become a machine and, despite Sub-Zero pledging to restore him, chose to sacrifice himself in the process of shutting down the factory.

Cyrax appears in one episode of the 2011 web series Mortal Kombat: Legacy, played by Shane Warren Jones. He and Sektor are shown being transformed at the Lin Kuei's secret headquarters with the operation overseen by Kano.

Cyrax was included with Sektor and Smoke atop GamesRadar's 2011 list of "gaming's most malicious machines", and Complex ranked him the fourth-coolest robot in video games in 2012. His episode of Legacy was well received, but critical reaction to his Fatalities has been mixed.

Ermac

Kabal

Khameleon
 Portrayed by: Becky Gable (MKT)
 Voiced by: Johanna Añonuevo (Armageddon)

Khameleon is a Zaterran who possesses the abilities of the franchise's female ninjas. Introduced in the Nintendo 64 version of Mortal Kombat Trilogy, she is the last known female of her race. Due to Shao Kahn's role in her race's near extinction, Khameleon seeks revenge against him. Khameleon was the franchise's only previously playable character excluded in the original release of Armageddon, but was added to the Wii version. Series art director Steve Beran acknowledged that she was included in Armageddon due to heavy fan demand.

The character placed 33rd in UGO's selection of the top fifty series characters, but IGN's Mitchell Saltzman listed Khameleon with Chameleon among the series' worst. "Unlike all of the other ninja palette swaps that eventually gained their own identity and playstyle, both Chameleons ... feel more like gimmicks than anything."

Motaro

Motaro is the sub-boss of Mortal Kombat 3 and its updates. A four-legged Centaurian, he leads Shao Kahn's extermination squads during the invasion of Earthrealm. In addition to his immense strength, he possesses the abilities to teleport, fire energy blasts from his tail, and deflect opponents' projectiles. He returns in Armageddon as a bipedal minotaur due to a curse placed on his species by the Shokan. Motaro is the only character from the first three installments not present during gameplay of the 2011 reboot; he only appears in the story mode's cinematics, which depict him being killed by Raiden.

John Tobias said that Motaro was inspired by a Micronauts toy figure of Baron Karza, which could be turned into a centaur by combining the toy with a horse figure packaged alongside it. Described by Ed Boon as one of the "oddest shaped" Mortal Kombat characters, Motaro was nearly excluded from Armageddon due to the developers' difficulty of compensating for his unique half-horse body shape. With fans desiring to see the character return, the developers removed Motaro's hind legs to allow him in the game.

The character has a minor role as one of Shao Kahn's main warriors in the 1997 film Mortal Kombat: Annihilation, and was played by Deron McBee. He appeared in two episodes of the 1996 animated series Mortal Kombat: Defenders of the Realm and the 2020 animated film Mortal Kombat Legends: Scorpion's Revenge.

Motaro placed 31st in UGO's 2012 ranking of the top fifty Mortal Kombat characters, noting him being a tough sub-boss to defeat. Den of Geek ranked Motaro 42nd in their 2015 rating of the franchise's then-64 playable characters. The bipedal version of Motaro was criticized by Robert Naytor of Hardcore Gaming 101, who considered his four legs "the one cool thing he had going for him." Marcus Stewart of Game Informer rated Motaro 57th in his 2021 ranking of the 76 playable series characters. "You'd think a centaur would be a cooler character, but Motaro hasn't made a ton of noise since his '90s heyday."

Nightwolf

Rain
 Portrayed by: John Turk (MKT); Tyrone Wiggins (Annihilation); Percy Brown (Conquest)
 Voiced by: Rino Romano (animated series); Andrew Bowen (MKX) Dempsey Pappion (MK11)

Rain makes his first series appearance in the attract mode of Ultimate Mortal Kombat 3, in which he attacks Shao Kahn on the Portal stage. He was then made a playable character in the home version of UMK3 and the compilation title Mortal Kombat Trilogy (1996) with his own distinct set of moves. In Trilogy, Rain has his own storyline in which he is an Edenian smuggled away from his homeland in the midst of the realm's takeover by Outworld emperor Shao Kahn. Thousands of years later, Rain resurfaces during Kahn's invasion of Earthrealm prior to the third Mortal Kombat tournament. Not wanting to suffer at the hand of Kahn's extermination squads, he betrays his homeland and sides with Kahn, who assigns him alongside fellow enslaved Edenians Kitana and Jade in fighting against the Earthrealm warriors. Rain is absent from the series thereafter until the training mode of Mortal Kombat: Deception (2004), and returns as a playable character in the compilation title Mortal Kombat: Armageddon (2006). As one of only seventeen characters in the game to receive an official biography, he plays his largest role in the original series continuity by learning of his true Edenian heritage from evil Outworld sorcerer Quan Chi, who informs Rain that he is a direct descendant of Argus, the protector god of Edenia, as well as the half-sibling of the game's protagonist Taven and his brother Daegon, both of whom were favored by their father to assume his mantle of Edenia's protectors.  Rain consequently starts to refer to himself as a prince of the realm, as seen in Armageddon's training mode, but he still chooses to independently fight on the side of evil. He confronts the game's protagonist Taven in the location of Arctika but is defeated in battle and flees into a portal. 

His storyline is altered in the 2011 Mortal Kombat reboot, which makes no mention of his father or siblings, instead simply describing him as having been orphaned at a young age by Kahn's conquest of Edenia and raised under the protection of Edenian resistance fighters. As he gained a reputation as an exceptional warrior, his level of arrogance followed suit, and he betrayed his comrades after being refused leadership of the resistance. This caught the attention of Kahn, who offered the power-hungry Rain an army of his own in exchange for his services. He was not part of the original playable roster but was later added to the game as downloadable content.

In Mortal Kombat X (2015), Rain is not playable and only appears in the game's story mode as Mileena's advisor, and tries to help her reclaim the Outworld throne from Kotal Kahn in the midst of a civil war. However, he plans to take the throne for himself when the war is over, but is stopped by D'Vorah. He returns in Mortal Kombat 11 again as downloadable content, and his role therein is that he manages to escape Kotal's capture. Rain's past is further explained in his arcade ending in which his father Argus had lied to Rain's birth mother, Amara, on the day after Rain was born and faked his death from her, leaving her to commit suicide out of heartbreak while Rain was callously sold to another family without her knowledge. Rain is furious upon later learning this information and swears vengeance against Argus and his own half-brothers Daegon and Taven, but leaves his stepmother Delia to suffer a similar fate as Amara.

Rain was inspired by the 1984 Prince song Purple Rain, along with MK co-creator Ed Boon, a longtime fan of the musician, also jokingly wondering what color palette had not yet been used for the series' ninja characters at the time Ultimate Mortal Kombat 3 was in production. After MK Trilogy, the character was given his own distinct designs in future appearances. 

Rain has received mixed to negative critical reception for his origins and his Fatalities. UGO ranked him 28th out of the series' top 50 characters in 2012. His later appearances were better received; Den of Geek ranked Rain 36th in his 2015 rating of the 64 series characters due to his MK9 ending and the expansion of his backstory in Armageddon as "a power-hungry jerk who believed that he was owed everything." GamesRadar+ noted his purple palette in the 2011 reboot as "a nice, rarely used color for male fighting game characters", while "his moves are so weird and confounding that they make every match a constant guessing game." Bleeding Cool considered Rain's MK11 appearance as his best to date due to his evolved moveset.

Sektor
Portrayed by: Sal Divita (MK3, UMK3); Peter Shinkoda (Legacy)
Voiced by: Andrew Kishino (MK9); Vic Chao (MKX); Dave B. Mitchell (2019-Present)
Sektor debuts in Mortal Kombat 3 as a member of the Lin Kuei clan along with Sub-Zero, Cyrax, and Smoke. When Sub-Zero defects after refusing to take part in the Lin Kuei's utilization of modern technology by converting its members into cyborgs, Sektor, along with Cyrax, is tasked with hunting down and killing Sub-Zero. Sektor is a secret character in Mortal Kombat Gold, in which he is the only active cyborg out of the original three, after Smoke is shut down in an Outworld prison before being enslaved by Noob Saibot while Cyrax's human soul is restored and he joins Sonya and Jax's Outer World Investigation Agency. Sektor believes the Lin Kuei Grandmaster is inferior and kills him, but Sub-Zero in turn defeats Sektor in battle and claims the title of grandmaster for himself. Sektor flees to Japan thereafter and forms his own clan of cyborg ninja warriors.

Sektor is not playable again until the compilation title Mortal Kombat: Armageddon, and plays a minor role in its training mode. In the 2011 series reboot, he is introduced during the first tournament as a human Chinese member of the clan who, along with Cyrax, is paid handsomely by tournament organizer Shang Tsung to compete and kill Earthrealm's fighters. Sektor is fervently supportive of the Lin Kuei's plan to robotize its members while Cyrax is the opposite; Sektor comes to blows with Cyrax when the latter refuses to kill Johnny Cage in battle, but is defeated. During the second Mortal Kombat tournament, a cyborg Sektor attempts to kidnap Smoke so he could be converted as well, only to be stopped by Raiden. However, in a reversal of Smoke and Sub-Zero's MK3 storylines, Sub-Zero is captured by the Lin Kuei inside Outworld emperor Shao Kahn's arena and eventually converted, with Sektor pledging his services to Kahn in exchange. When Shao Kahn launches an invasion of Earthrealm, Sektor and the cyberized Lin Kuei launch their own attack on the Earthrealm defenders to stop them from interfering with Kahn's plans, only to be thwarted by defeated by Nightwolf. Despite this, Shao Kahn's wife Sindel completes the clan's objective of slaughtering the Earthrealm warriors.

In Mortal Kombat X and Mortal Kombat 11, Sektor is not playable, but he takes part in the latter's story mode. A time-displaced Sektor and his cyber Lin Kuei army are revived by the keeper of time Kronika and brought into her ranks. They are joined by Sub-Zero's former apprentice, Frost, who succeeds Sektor after she is converted into a cyborg. He, Cyrax, and Frost, backed by Noob Saibot, kidnap Sub-Zero's Lin Kuei warriors and forcibly robotize them. After learning of what they had done, Sub-Zero and Hanzo Hasashi (Scorpion) arrive at the Cyber Lin Kuei's factory to shut it down. Sektor declares to Sub-Zero that allying with Hanzo is dishonorable, but is soon deactivated when Cyrax shuts down the factory. Sektor's body is used by Kronika's allies to revive him and the cyber Lin Kuei. The cyborgs join the Black Dragon crime cartel in storming the Special Forces base, where Kano uses a kill switch installed in Sektor's systems to destroy it. In Sub-Zero's arcade ending, he discovers Sektor was responsible for having corrupted his deceased older brother Bi-Han before he eventually became Noob Saibot.

Sektor appears in one episode of the 2011 web series Mortal Kombat: Legacy, played by Peter Shinkoda. He and Cyrax are shown being transformed at the Lin Kuei's secret headquarters with the operation overseen by Kano. The character has a minor part in DC Comics' 2015 Mortal Kombat X: Blood Ties comic miniseries that is set before the events of the game, and he appears in the animated film Mortal Kombat Legends: Battle of the Realms (2021).

Sektor was nicknamed "Ketchup" during production of MK3 before his official name was determined, while the robot ninjas' designs were inspired by Boba Fett and the Predator. He has been lauded by gaming media outlets for his Fatalities over the course of the Mortal Kombat series. UGO placed him 26th—one spot behind Cyrax—in their 2012 list of the top fifty series characters.

Sheeva
Portrayed by: Marjean Holden (Annihilation)
Voiced by: Dawnn Lewis (animated series); Lori McClain (Armageddon); Lani Minella (MK9); Vanessa Marshall (2019-present)

Sheeva is a Shokan warrior like Goro and Kintaro, and is the series' lone female representative of the four-armed race. She has a long-standing rivalry with Motaro, as the Shokan and his race of Centaurians are bitter enemies. She debuts in MK3 as Queen Sindel's appointed bodyguard and protector following Shao Kahn's invasion of Earth. She is not playable in the series again until Mortal Kombat: Armageddon, in which the then-entire series roster is playable. In the 2011 reboot that retells the continuity of the first three games, she is immediately playable and plays a minor role in the game's story mode as Kahn's bodyguard and jailer. In Mortal Kombat 11, Sheeva was a late addition to the roster as downloadable content as part of the game's Aftermath expansion pack. She additionally has a more significant role in the series for the first time, as she aids a time-traveling Shang Tsung in retrieving Kronika's Crown of Souls so Liu Kang can restore history after exploiting her blood oath to Sindel. Sheeva assists in reviving Sindel so she can join them as well, but upon learning of her treachery Sheeva attempts to stop her but is defeated.

The character's name was derived from Shiva, the Hindu deity of destruction. She was added to the game due to fan requests for a playable version of Goro, like whom she was created as a stop motion-animated clay figurine. Series co-creator John Tobias opted for a female version of the character as she would be physically smaller in size and thus take up less room on the screen. She was omitted from the home versions of Ultimate Mortal Kombat 3 due to memory constraints.

Sheeva (voiced by Dawnn Lewis) had a recurring role in the 1996 animated series Mortal Kombat: Defenders of the Realm. In the 1997 feature film Mortal Kombat: Annihilation, she was played by Marjean Holden in a brief appearance with her only action sequence being a brief scuffle with Motaro, though the film acknowledges her then-current role in the games as Sindel's personal protector. In the 2015 Mortal Kombat X: Blood Ties prequel comic miniseries produced by DC Comics, Sheeva is crowned by Kintaro as the current leader of the Shokan in a peaceful treaty with Kotal Kahn, following the death of previous rule King Gorbak. Sheeva mourns Kintaro's death after Sonya — possessed by Havik — kills him in battle.

Reception of the character has been mixed. While Wirtualna Polska featured Sheeva among gaming's top ten female villains in 2011, she placed a middling 28th in UGO.com's 2012 ranking of their top fifty Mortal Kombat characters, and 47th in Den of Geek's 2019 ranking of the series' 77 playable characters. Game Informer, in 2010, stated that "despite a somewhat cool ground-pound move [in MK3], she was an addition to the series that never really served a purpose or did anything particularly noteworthy." However, her Fatalities over the course of her appearances have been fairly well received.

Sindel
Portrayed by: Lia Montelongo (MK3); Musetta Vander (Annihilation); Beatrice King (Legacy)
Voiced by: Laura Boton (MK:D); Lani Minella (MK9); Kelly Hu (MKX); Mara Junot (MK11) 

Sindel debuts in MK3 as the queen of Edenia alongside her daughter, Princess Kitana, but her kingdom loses ten consecutive Mortal Kombat tournaments and is invaded by Shao Kahn, resulting in a forceful merging of the two realms. After her husband King Jerrod is killed and their then-infant daughter Kitana is adopted by Kahn, she commits suicide rather than become his consort. Kahn resurrects her with the assistance of the sorcerer Shang Tsung in Earthrealm, allowing Kahn to invade Earthrealm while regaining his queen in the process. Sindel is successfully revived but in a brainwashed state with no knowledge of her past. After the Earthrealm defenders defeat Kahn, Kitana convinces Sindel her of her true past, turning Sindel against the emperor. 

Sindel is not playable in Mortal Kombat 4, but one of her subjects, Tanya, betrays her homeland and allows the fallen Elder God Shinnok's Netherrealm forces to invade her palace. Though Kitana escapes, Sindel is imprisoned in her own dungeon until Shinnok's forces are defeated. Sindel then sends Kitana to form an alliance with the Shokan armies and lead them into battle against a weakened Shao Kahn while she continues to help restore Edenia to its former beauty. Edenia is once again invaded in the storyline of Mortal Kombat: Deception, this time by the Dragon King Onaga, who had killed and resurrected Kitana and her Earthrealm allies before placing them under his control. Sindel is once again confined to her own prison, guarded by her own daughter until she is freed by Jade. In MK: Armageddon, Sindel is playable along with the entire series roster but was not among the only seventeen characters to receive an official biography and did not play a part in the game's storyline.

In the 2011 Mortal Kombat reboot that retells the game's first three titles, Sindel is instead resurrected by Quan Chi and is the recipient of Shang Tsung's powers, enabling her to kill most of Earthrealm's warriors along with Kitana before Nightwolf sacrifices himself to kill her. Sindel is then again resurrected by Quan Chi but as one of his undead revenants, as which she returns in Mortal Kombat X as one of Quan Chi and Shinnok's Netherrealm enforcers. 

In Mortal Kombat 11, Sindel is a downloadable character in the Aftermath expansion pack, in which her history from her previous series appearances is retconned to her having actually lied about her backstory from MK3 in order to appease her subjects, when in reality she personally kills King Jerrod out of spite for his perceived weakness and willingly becomes Shao Kahn's wife to gain more power. Quan Chi, believing Sindel is distracting Kahn, kills her and makes it appear as a suicide before using her soul to temporarily stop Kahn from invading Earthrealm. Shang Tsung captures Sindel's revenant form and revives her to help him secure Kronika's Crown of Souls. Sindel agrees and helps him while also reconsolidating her power with Shao Kahn before betraying Kitana and Earthrealm's forces. After helping Shang Tsung breach Kronika's keep, however, the sorcerer in turn betrays Sindel and Kahn, absorbing their souls in retaliation for killing him to empower Sindel in MK9.

During production of MK3, Sindel was nicknamed "The Bride" and "Muchacha" by the developers before her official name was determined. She was played by actress Lia Montelongo, who was nineteen years old at the time. 

Sindel has a supporting role in the 1997 film Mortal Kombat: Annihilation, and was portrayed by Musetta Vander. Her general backstory with Kitana was kept intact, and in a film-exclusive subplot, she is additionally named the new general of Shao Kahn's extermination squads. In the final battle at the film's climax, she is defeated by Kitana, who elects to spare her life, and after Kahn's death, she is brought back to life with Kahn's curse broken. Sindel (played by Beatrice King) briefly appears in an episode of the 2011 web series Mortal Kombat Legacy, in which her backstory during Kahn's takeover of Edenia is featured.

Sindel has been positively received for her role in the games and her Fatalities,Mortal Kombat's Best And Worst Fatalities, Game Informer, May 03, 2010 but her MK11 retcon was met with heavy fan criticism, while her portrayal in Annihilation has been ridiculed.

Stryker

Introduced in Mortal Kombat Mythologies: Sub-Zero

Fujin
 Portrayed by: Anthony Marquez (MKM:SZ); Nic Toussaint (MKX)
 Voiced by: Herman Sanchez (MK4), David Horachek (MK:A), Troy Baker (MKX), Matthew Yang King (2020-present)

Fujin is the god of wind based on the Japanese deity of the same name. He first appears as an unnamed boss in MK Mythologies: Sub-Zero, where he unsuccessfully guards Shinnok's amulet from Sub-Zero. He makes his playable debut in Mortal Kombat 4, which sees him succeed Raiden as Earthrealm's protector after Raiden becomes an Elder God. Fujin returns in Armageddon, where he is defeated by Taven after attempting to prevent him from continuing his quest. In the rebooted timeline, Fujin appears in Mortal Kombat Xs story mode fighting the Netherrealm's forces alongside Raiden, but is not playable until his inclusion in the Aftermath expansion for Mortal Kombat 11, in which he, Shang Tsung, and Nightwolf try to save their universe by obtaining Kronika's crown. Fujin is ultimately betrayed by Shang Tsung, who drains his soul but keeps him alive to continue draining his powers for eternity. In Shang Tsung's ending, Fujin and Raiden become his servants.

Fujin placed 40th in UGO's 2012 listing of the top fifty series characters. In 2014, Prima Games included Fujin among their twenty "cheapest" characters in the series due to having a crossbow as his primary weapon. Ed Boon later admitted regret to giving Fujin easy access to a projectile weapon; in his later appearances, Fujin would only be able to use the crossbow for special attacks.

Quan Chi

Sareena
 Portrayed by: Lia Montelongo (MKM:SZ); Dana Hee (Konquest)
 Voiced by: Danielle Nicolet (MKX)

Sareena is a demon from the Netherrealm. She debuts in Mythologies: Sub-Zero as an assassin assigned by Quan Chi to kill Bi-Han, the original Sub-Zero. After being spared by Bi-Han, she assists him in defeating Quan Chi, but is killed by Shinnok. Sareena returns as a playable character in the Tournament Edition port of Mortal Kombat: Deadly Alliance, which reveals Shinnok's attack banished her to a lower plane of the Netherrealm. Escaping through a portal, she is offered asylum in Earthrealm by the younger Sub-Zero. However, the Konquest mode of Armageddon sees her again serving Quan Chi, leading to her being defeated by Taven. Following a background cameo in the 2011 reboot, Sareena appears in the story mode of Mortal Kombat X, where she assists the Special Forces in battling the Netherrealm's forces.

The 1996 television series Mortal Kombat: Conquest featured an original character named Siann, played by Dana Hee, who was inspired by Sareena, but remained loyal to Quan Chi. She was ranked 26th on Den of Geek's rating of the series' 64 player characters, with the site deeming her "Sub-Zero's one moment of humanity snowballing into something meaningful".

Shinnok

Introduced in Mortal Kombat 4

Jarek
Performed by: Mark Myers (MK4)
Voiced by: Jon Hey (MK4), James Freeman-Hargis (MK:A)
Jarek is a member of the Black Dragon clan. Established in Mortal Kombat 4 as the last known Black Dragon, he possesses Kano's special moves and Fatalities. He helps defend Earthrealm against Shinnok, but falls off a cliff in the aftermath when the Special Forces attempt to arrest him. In Armageddon, Jarek is revealed to have survived and develops an obsession with killing all of his opponents. Jarek also appears as one of the bosses in Special Forces, where he is defeated by Jax. In the Mortal Kombat X prequel comic, he is imprisoned in Outworld by Kotal Kahn.

Modeled after Midway character artist Herman Sanchez, Jarek received a tepid reception for his similarities to Kano, for which he has been ranked among the series' worst characters by gaming media, in addition to his Mortal Kombat 4 arcade ending in which he throws the pursuing Sonya off a cliff.

Kai
 Portrayed by: Kimball Uddin (MK4)
 Voiced by: Ed Boon (MK4)
Kai is a Shaolin Monk and member of the White Lotus Society. He debuts in Mortal Kombat 4 as one of the warriors defending Earthrealm from Shinnok. Afterwards, he goes on quest for self-enlightenment, although he returns in Armageddon.

According to Ed Boon, Kai was developed as an "African American character who was very nimble like Liu Kang" with vertical fireball projectiles. He was also the first character to perform a handstand during gameplay, which was intended to be his main fighting style in Armageddon, but Boon stated this was prevented by time limitations.

Kai came in at 47th on UGO's 2012 list of the top 50 Mortal Kombat characters. Robert Naytor of Hardcore Gaming 101 said, "With all his projectile moves, he's basically the black Liu Kang".

Meat
Meat was originally a skin created by art director Tony Goskie that would depict each fighter in Mortal Kombat 4 as a bloodied corpse. After being established as a canonical character in Deceptions Konquest mode, he received a backstory and unique special moves in Armageddon. His Armageddon ending reveals that he is an experiment created by Shang Tsung who escaped the sorcerer's clutches before he could be completed. Prima Games' strategy guide for Armageddon also states that Meat assists Shinnok, although this relationship is not established in the game.

Meat placed 49th in UGO's 2012 listing of the top fifty MK characters, noting that he became a fan favorite for his "ridiculously gruesome moves". Conversely, ScrewAttack ranked Meat fourth in its 2011 ranking of the series' ten worst characters for being "a generic [character] model" without flesh. Ryan Aston of Topless Robot placed Meat second in his selection of eight characters "that are goofy even by Mortal Kombat standards," calling him "a gory riff" on Soulcalibur character Charade and his storyline "a truly flimsy excuse for his existence".

Reiko
 Portrayed by: Jim Helsinger (Konquest), Nathan Jones (2021 film)
 Voiced by: Ed Boon (MK:D), David Beron (MK:A), Robin Atkin Downes (MKL:BOTR)
Reiko is a general who has served Shinnok and Shao Kahn. He first appears assisting Shinnok's invasion in Mortal Kombat 4, while Armageddon depicts him under Shao Kahn's command. After making a background cameo in the 2011 reboot, he appears in the Mortal Kombat X prequel comics, where he becomes a blood god before being betrayed and killed by Havik.

The character was added to Mortal Kombat 4 to replace Noob Saibot after the developers found that the game had too many ninja characters. While his original ending simply depicted him walking through a portal, Reiko's FMV ending showed him wearing the helmet of Shao Kahn. This led to speculation that Reiko was Shao Kahn, which was dispelled when the Konquest mode of Deception revealed that Reiko would sneak into Shao Kahn's throne room to wear his helmet. In an interview, John Tobias stated that Reiko was intended to be a reincarnation of Shao Kahn, but this story would be disregarded in later installments. Nevertheless, Reiko's appearance and special moves in Armageddon would be stylized after Shao Kahn.

Outside of the games, Jim Helsinger played Reiko in the 1998 television series Mortal Kombat: Conquest, where he is one of Shao Kahn's generals. Reiko also appeared in the 2021 Mortal Kombat film, portrayed by Nathan Jones, as one of the Outworld champions. He faces off against Jax in the film's final battle, eventually being killed when Jax crushes his head. Reiko appears in the 2020 animated film Mortal Kombat Legends: Battle of the Realms, voiced by Robin Atkin Downes.

Reiko placed 42nd on UGO's 2012 list of the top 50 Mortal Kombat characters. Gavin Jasper of Den of Geek rated Reiko last in his 2015 ranking of the series' playable characters for what he considered the wasted potential of his storyline in regards to his connection to Shao Kahn. WhatCulture ranked him fourteenth in their 2015 selection of the series' twenty worst characters for "having zero individuality".

Tanya
 Performed by: Lia Montelongo (MK4)
 Voiced by: Rosalind Dugas (MK4), Beth Melewski (MK:D), Jennifer Hale (MKX)

Tanya is an Edenian who aligns herself with the series' villains. Often acting out of self-preservation, she betrays Edenia to Shinnok in Mortal Kombat 4 and Onaga in Deception. In the story mode of Mortal Kombat X, Tanya joins Mileena's rebellion against Kotal Kahn with the intent of liberating Edenia from Outworld; she is defeated by D'Vorah, but spared at Cassie Cage's behest.

Named after Ed Boon's sister Tania, Tanya was created to replace Kitana in Mortal Kombat 4. She placed 34th on UGO's 2012 list of the top 50 MK characters. Complex named Tanya seventh in their 2011 selection of the top ten underrated MK characters, calling her "the traitor of all traitors in the series, switching her allegiance more times than we can count". Conversely, Den of Geek rated her 68th in their 2015 ranking of the franchise's 73 player characters for being "a one-dimensional villain whose only quality is betrayal".

Introduced in Mortal Kombat: Special Forces

Tremor
 Voiced by: Fred Tatasciore (MKX), Imari Williams (MKL:SB)

Tremor is a ninja member of the Black Dragon clan. As implied by his name, he is able to manipulate the Earth with his immense strength. He is initially depicted as a brown-clad ninja, but would be redesigned to have a body made out of rocks. Originally intended as a playable character for Mortal Kombat Trilogy, Tremor instead debuted as a boss in Special Forces, where he is killed by Jax. He made his playable debut as a downloadable character in Mortal Kombat X, although he has no involvement in the story. In the Mortal Kombat X prequel comic, it is revealed that Tremor was imprisoned in Outworld by Kotal Kahn.

Introduced in Mortal Kombat: Deadly Alliance

Blaze
 Voiced by: Simeon Norfleet (MK:A)

Blaze is a fire elemental created to monitor the warriors of the realms. He appears as a hidden character in Deadly Alliance, which depicts him being forced to protect the last known dragon egg by Onaga's followers. After the egg hatches, completing Onaga's resurrection, Blaze is able to continue monitoring the warriors, which causes him to discover that they have become too powerful for the realms in his absence. He serves as the final boss of Armageddon, where he brings all the fighters together for a final battle. As part of his mission to prevent an impending Armageddon, Blaze has Taven face him in a fight intended to either kill all the warriors or strip them of their powers. The 2011 reboot reveals that Blaze was instead defeated by Shao Kahn, prompting Raiden's efforts to change the timeline.

Prior to becoming to becoming a playable character, Blaze originated in the background of Mortal Kombat IIs Pit II stage as a Liu Kang palette swap covered in flames and facing off against another Liu Kang palette swap. The character was nicknamed "Torch" by fans, but due to the risk of copyright infringement on the Marvel character Human Torch, Midway officially named him Blaze. In reference to his original role, he has made cameo appearances in Shaolin Monks, the 2011 reboot, Mortal Kombat X, and Mortal Kombat 11, which all feature the Pit II.

The character placed 37th on UGO's 2012 list of the top 50 Mortal Kombat characters, which remarked, "Although [guarding the Dragon Egg] doesn't sound like the job of a badass, you'll change your mind once you see Blaze steamrolling his way towards you". Garth Kaestner of G3AR ranked Blaze the sixth worst character in the franchise, calling him "an example of how some things should be laid to rest before they have begun".

Bo' Rai Cho
 Voiced by: Carlos Pesina (MK:DA, MK:D, MK:A); Steve Blum (MKX)
Bo' Rai Cho is a martial arts master skilled in the style of drunken boxing. His attacks mostly center around his weight and bodily functions. An Outworld native, but an opponent of Shao Kahn's tyranny, he trained Liu Kang and many other Earthrealm warriors for the Mortal Kombat tournament as his participation would be on the behalf of Shao Kahn. For his debut in Deadly Alliance, Bo' Rai Cho trains Kung Lao after he learns of Liu Kang's death. In Deception, he rescues Li Mei from having her soul trapped inside one of the corpses of Onaga's army. Bo' Rai Cho is later tricked by Mileena, posing as Kitana, into leading Kitana's army to certain defeat against Baraka's forces, but Bo' Rai Cho emerges victorious with the help of Liu Kang. He returns in Mortal Kombat X, where he is attacked by Shinnok; his fate afterwards is left unknown.

The character's name is a play on "borracho", the Spanish word for "drunk". According to Herman Sanchez, Bo' Rai Cho was created because Ed Boon sought to have a "slob" fighter, while John Vogel found that he filled the "master" role for the franchise.

Reception to Bo' Rai Cho has been generally negative for his appearance and gross-out nature. Den of Geek ranked him 55th in their rating of the series' 73 characters, calling Bo' Rai Cho "a Shaw Brothers Boogerman, and the gag wears thin after the third time you use his puke attack". Robert Naytor of Hardcore Gaming 101 unfavorably compared him to Virtua Fighter character Shun Di as "a big, fat guy" who is utilized to "throw up and fart a lot". ScrewAttack rated him tenth in their 2011 list of the series' ten worst characters, noting that his in-game weapon was plain wooden staff. However, Bo' Rai Cho placed 37th on UGO's 2012 list of the top 50 MK characters, which called his comic relief role "a breath of fresh air. Or, in his case, a belch of fresh air". Complex named him one of the series' most underrated characters in 2011. By contrast, he was listed as the eighth-worst Mortal Kombat character by Mitchell Saltzman of IGN, whom opined "Bo Rai Cho feels like a mess of ideas all sloppily thrown together to create a character of contradictions."

Bo' Rai Cho is mentioned by Liu Kang in the 2021 reboot film, but does not physically appear.

Drahmin
 Voiced by: Rich Carle (MK:D)
Drahmin is a demonic Oni who resides in the Netherrealm. He and Moloch are hired by Quan Chi to protect him against Scorpion in exchange for freedom from the Netherrealm, but after Quan Chi betrays them, they align themselves with Shang Tsung to help him counter Quan Chi's treachery. While in Shang Tsung's palace, Drahmin and Moloch encounter Scorpion, whom they defeat by throwing into the palace's Soulnado. Drahmin returns in the Mortal Kombat X prequel comic, where he is killed by Quan Chi.

Ed Boon described Drahmin as one of the most difficult characters to program because specific code had to written to prevent Drahmin's arm-mounted club from switching sides whenever the character turned around during gameplay.  Drahmin has received a mostly negative reception; G3AR named him among the worst series characters for his "hideous" appearance and lack of combo abilities. Den of Geek rated him 47th in their 2015 ranking of the 64 series characters, describing him as "a collection of cool concepts that doesn't make for much of a sum" whereas "Moloch does a lot more with less".

Frost
Voiced by: Christine Rios (MK:A); Kelly Hu (MKX); Sara Cravens (2019-present)

Frost is a Lin Kuei warrior who possesses the ability to control ice. She was trained directly by Sub-Zero due to the similarities between them and the potential he saw in her, but her skills were compounded by her arrogant nature. When Sub-Zero has her accompany him in Deadly Alliance to help battle Quan Chi and Shang Tsung, Frost steals his Dragon Medallion, which results in her being frozen by her own powers. Frost is revealed to have survived in the Unchained port of Deception, where Sub-Zero traps her in a block of ice after she attempts to kill him. She is freed by Taven in the Konquest mode of Armageddon, but attacks him after mistaking him for Sub-Zero and is defeated. Following cameos in the 2011 reboot and Mortal Kombat Xs story mode, Frost returns as a playable character in Mortal Kombat 11, which depicts her receiving cybernetic enhancements. Aligning herself with Kronika by leading the Cyber Lin Kuei against Earthrealm's heroes, she is defeated by Raiden, who shuts down the cyborgs by deactivating her link to them.

The character was the first designed by Herman Sanchez for Deadly Alliance. She was placed eighth  in Complexs selection of the series' ten most underrated characters in 2011. Den of Geek placed Frost 37th in their 2015 ranking of the series' 73 player characters, calling her addition "a nice touch" to Sub-Zero's rebuilding of the Lin Kuei.

Hsu Hao
Hsu Hao is a member of the Red Dragon clan distinguished by his cybernetic heart. After infiltrating the Special Forces, Hsu Hao destroys their Outerworld Investigation Agency branch with a nuclear device in Deadly Alliance. He is eventually found by Jax, who kills him by ripping out his cybernetic heart. Despite this, he returns in Armageddon. Hsu Hao also appears in the Mortal Kombat X comic prequel, where he attempts to kill Kenshi for "betraying" the Red Dragon, only to be killed by Scorpion.

During development, the character was called Kublai Khan after the Mongolian emperor of the same name. Steve Beran described him as "the anti-Jax" whose cybernetic heart was the result of experiments performed on him by the Chinese army. According to Ed Boon, Hsu Hao had a number of different iterations, with his "Hand Clap" special move inspired by superhero comics.

Hsu Hao is widely regarded as one of the worst characters in the Mortal Kombat franchise. G3AR ranked him second in their 2013 list of the series' ten worst characters and Den of Geek's 2015 ranking of the series' 73 characters also placed him as the second worst. Robert Naytor of Hardcore Gaming 101 described the character as "a slightly racist take at a Village Person". Naming him the series' worst character in 2014, Destructoid noted that "in a game that was littered with lackluster new additions, he was without a doubt the runt of that litter". This negative reception is also present in the development team, with John Vogel intending his death in Deadly Alliance to be canon and Boon making him the first character officially omitted from the Mortal Kombat X playable character roster.Who's Next? Ed Boon's Mortal Kombat X Character Deadpool! - Mortal Kombat Online, June 8, 2014. Retrieved October 16, 2014.

Kenshi

Li Mei
Voiced by: Lina Chern (MK:D), Tara Strong (MKX), Grey Griffin (MKL:BOTR)
Li Mei is an Outworld native from a small village. In Deadly Alliance, she is forced into a tournament by Shang Tsung and Quan Chi with the promise that her victory would free her village. However, upon winning the tournament, Shang Tsung attempts to place her soul into the corpse of one of Onaga's soldiers. Deception reveals that Li Mei was saved by Bo' Rai Cho, but her contact with the corpse causes her to feel a connection with Onaga. She makes a brief appearance in the story mode of Mortal Kombat X, where she leads a number of Outworld refugees into Earthrealm after Mileena uses Shinnok's amulet to destroy her village.

Reception to Li Mei has been mixed, with criticism directed towards her Deception design. Den of Geek rated her 57th in their 2015 ranking of the series' entire 73-character roster, feeling she was "only distinguished by her ridiculous outfit of a bandana and underwear". Joe Pring of WhatCulture rated Li Mei sixth in his 2015 selection of the twenty worst Mortal Kombat characters for "[wearing] a bandana while dancing around in metal-plated underwear", which he stated "deserves to be ridiculed".

Mavado
Voiced by: Alex Brandon (MK:A)

Mavado is a high-ranking member of the Red Dragon clan. As his clan's top priority is the elimination of the Black Dragon, he aligns himself with Quan Chi and Shang Tsung in Deadly Alliance when they promise to hand over Kano to him for his services. Mavado defeats Kenshi on their behest, but Deception reveals that he was killed by Kabal after an unsuccessful attempt on Kabal's life.Kabal's Bio. Mortal Kombat: Deception, Midway Games, 2004. Nevertheless, he returns in Armageddon continuing to serve the Red Dragon. Mavado also appears in the Mortal Kombat X comic prequel, where he is killed by Cassie Cage.

Originally named "Malvado", the Spanish word for "evil", Steve Beran conceived a matador-style look for the character, but the idea was nixed due to the belief that it did not fit in with the Mortal Kombat universe. He is the first character in the series to a physical object for a body-propel special attack, which he performs by shooting two bungee cords into the ground and slingshotting himself feet-first to dropkick his opponent. This attack was incorporated into his "Boot Thrust" Fatality.

Robert Workman of GamePlayBook ranked him eighth in his 2010 selection of the worst MK characters, describing his Fatality as "stupid", but Den of Geek, placed him 39th in their 2015 ranking of the series' 73 characters "for his bungee hook attacks" and taking Kabal's weapons after killing him.

Mokap
Mokap is a motion capture actor with an extensive martial arts background. He debuted as a hidden character in Deadly Alliance, but has no involvement with the story; his biography follows Johnny Cage's non-canonical ending of a Deadly Alliance film being created. Mokap also has a limited role in the conflict of Armageddon, where his involvement is said to be by mistake.

Named after the abbreviation for motion capture, Mokap is based on Midway graphic artist Carlos Pesina, who provided the motion capture work for Deadly Alliance. Pesina admitted it was "pretty flattering" being included in the game, but also remarked it was "weird" seeing Fatalities performed on him.

Reception to Mokap has been mostly negative. Den of Geek rated him 55th in their 2015 ranking of the series characters, stating that he "didn't really work well as a comedy character because the game did little to differentiate the characters in terms of personality". In their ranking of the 10 worst characters, ScrewAttack placed Mokap second because "nobody wants to play as a dude with balls on his body".

Moloch
 Voiced by: Bob Ladewig (MK:D)
Moloch is the sub-boss of Deadly Alliance. An Oni demon of immense size and strength, he and Drahmin are hired by Quan Chi to protect him against Scorpion in exchange for freedom from the Netherrealm. After Quan Chi betrays them by leaving them behind, Moloch and Drahmin align themselves with Shang Tsung to help him counter Quan Chi's treachery. They also defeat Scorpion by throwing him into the Soulnado at Shang Tsung's palace. Moloch also appears in the Mortal Kombat X prequel comic, where Quan Chi has him killed the revenant Kitana. In reference to his comic death, Quan Chi is seen holding Moloch's severed head during his Mortal Kombat X pre-match introductions.

Designed by Allen Ditzig, Moloch's concept changed little from his finalized design. Den of Geek rated him 21st in their 2015 ranking of the series' 64 characters, praising his sub-boss role and possessing "some utter brutality that hadn't been felt in a Mortal Kombat boss since Kintaro". Bryan Dawson of Prima Games named Moloch in his 2014 selection of the "cheapest" Mortal Kombat characters for his playable version in Armageddon having "a near infinite combo limited only by the size of the stage" and "ridiculous reach with most of his special moves".

Nitara
Portrayed by: Mel Jarnson (2021 film)
Nitara is a vampire from the realm of Vaeternus. In Deadly Alliance, she seeks to destroy the orb that binds her realm to Outworld. As the orb is inside of a lava pit that Cyrax is able to enter, Nitara orchestrates a series of events to force Cyrax into helping her in exchange for passage back to Earthrealm. She ultimately succeeds in destroying the orb with Cyrax's assistance, freeing Vaeternus. Her biography in Armageddon states that Nitara leaves Vaeternus for Edenia in an effort to prevent her species from being exterminated by Ashrah, although this is not established during the game.

The character was designed by Luis Mangubat. A male vampire counterpart was also planned for Deadly Alliance, but the developers were unable to add him to the game in time. In the game's Konquest mode, she was featured in a fictional "Blood" energy drink advertisement.

Nitara appears in the 2021 Mortal Kombat film, portrayed by Mel Jarnson. Depicted as one of the Outworld champions, she is killed by Kung Lao with his hat.

UGO ranked Nitara 46th on their 2012 list of the top fifty series characters. In 2011, Complex named her one of the series' most underrated characters, stating that "Buffy would get her ass handed to her by this chick". Melody MacReady at Screen Rant listed her as one of the characters she wanted to see in MK11, where she noted "Frost was given a revamp and so was Fujin much to the surprise of fans. Perhaps if given a new design, a unique vampiric skill set, and extra skins based on the movie, Nitara could also become a fan favorite."

Introduced in Mortal Kombat: Deception

Ashrah
 Voiced by: Johanna Añonuevo (MK:D, MK:A)
Ashrah is a demon from the Netherrealm. During the events of Deception, she discovers a magical sword that cleanses her soul when she uses it to kill demons. As having a purified soul will allow her to escape the Netherrealm, Ashrah plots to kill Noob Saibot to complete her redemption. Her Armageddon biography reveals that after leaving the Netherrealm, she is tasked with killing the vampires in Vaeternus. Nitara's Armageddon biography further reveals that Ashrah's sword merely manipulates its wielder into believing it purifies them by killing vampires, setting up a conflict between Nitara and Ashrah; this storyline, however, is not depicted in the game.

Ed Boon commented that the character was commonly misconceived as a female version of Raiden due to her similar outfit and believed she would have the "biggest impact" out of the new characters from Deception. Ashrah was ranked 45th on UGO's 2012 list of the top 50 Mortal Kombat characters. Den of Geek placed her 53rd in their 2015 ranking of the 64 series characters, opining that there was "nothing special about her". Robert Naytor of Hardcore Gaming 101 made note of the character's "modest outfit" in contrast to the franchise's other female characters, but criticized her minor role in the story. Although Kevin Wong of Complex found Ashrah to be "a Raiden knockoff", he praised her "Voodoo Doll" Fatality from Deception.

Dairou
 Voiced by: Josh Schmittstenstein (MK:D)
Dairou is a mercenary from Orderrealm. He was formerly a member of his realm's guardsmen until was arrested after killing an assailant out of rage and began following his own personal code once he escaped from prison. He is hired by an unknown individual to assassinate Hotaru, and it is implied in Darrius’ biography and ending, respectively, that he is responsible for tricking Dairou into killing the individual he believed murdered his family, and additionally hired him to steal their realm's Declaration of Order.

Dairou was slated to appear in Deadly Alliance as an armored samurai-type character wielding a pair of katanas, but was left out of the game due to time constraints and the complexity of the design. For Deception, his original design was eschewed in favor of a more classical Chinese appearance. Ed Boon deemed the character's "Tombstone Drop" maneuver, where he slams backfirst onto the ground and sends his opponent airborne for a combo, one of the best moves in the game. He makes a brief appearance in the 2022 animated film Mortal Kombat Legends: Snow Blind as one of Kano’s Black Dragon henchmen, but has no dialogue. 

Although Boon had praise for Dairou's appearance, reception to the character has been negative. He was ranked 67th by Den of Geek in their 2015 rating of the series' 73 playable characters, describing him as "unbelievably generic", and Dustin Thomas of Destructoid stated "there really isn't a whole lot to say about him" while ranking him third in his 2014 list of the series' five worst MK characters. Despite this, his "Ribs to the Eyes" Fatality in Deception is regarded as one of the franchise's best.

Darrius
 Voiced by: Steve Jones (MK:D)
Darrius is the leader of a resistance movement in Orderrealm. He seeks to overthrow his realm's government, believing they are too oppressive towards their citizens. To accomplish his goal, Darrius exploits the laws of his realm to manipulate others into joining his movement; his Deception biography implies that he had Dairou's family murdered to instigate Dairou's removal from the guardsmen.

Designed by Steve Beran, Darrius was the last new addition to the Deception roster. Beran described Darrius as having "a 'take no B.S.' attitude, like a star athlete who had made his way to fame from a rough upbringing and humble beginnings", while Ed Boon considered him a more "Americanized" fighting game character who had an indescribable "appeal" about him and Herman Sanchez called the character "lean and mean, aggressive, [and with] style." According to Beran, the character's look was inspired by 1960s and '70s comic book art, with his final appearance "intended to be a mixture of those elements fused with a sleek modern approach". His alternate costume was a homage to actor Jim Kelly. Lead storyteller John Vogel expressed his desire to see Darrius in future MK installments, although he has not reappeared since Armageddon.

Darrius was rated 44th in the 2015 ranking of the series' 73 player characters by Gavin Jasper of Den of Geek, who found him "worth revisiting down the line". Conversely, ScrewAttack named Darrius the sixth worst Mortal Kombat character, calling him a "knock-off" of the Marvel Comics hero Blade.

Havik
 Voiced by: Ryan Rosenberg (MK:D, MK:A)
Havik is a denizen of Chaosrealm. As with the rest of his realm, his primary goal is to spread disorder through the universe. In Deception, he pursues his goal by luring the heroes into battle with Onaga. He also convinces Kabal to reform the Black Dragon after saving him from death. Havik is prominently featured in the Mortal Kombat X prequel comic, which sees him killed by Quan Chi. However, Shang Tsung states that he is still alive during the events of Mortal Kombat 11: Aftermath.

The character was designed by Steve Beran as an alternate outfit for Noob Saibot before being given a storyline of his own. His original name during development of Deception was "Skab". Ed Boon said that Havik was envisioned as a "decaying" character whose specials would look "disturbing" due to often featuring his limbs breaking.

Havik is generally regarded as the best character introduced in Deception. Dustin Thomas of Destructoid called him "the only new character in Deception worthy of being a Mortal Kombat character". Hardcore Gaming 101 described Havik as "probably the least lamest of the newcomers in Deception, even though that's not saying much". Ranking him 30th in their 2015 rating of the series' 73 characters, Den of Geek said, "While the whole Orderrealm/Chaosrealm subplot never quite caught on, Havik is strong enough to exist on his own." 

Hotaru
 Voiced by: Chase Ashbaker (MK:D)
Hotaru is a high-ranking guardsman in Orderrealm. Although not inherently evil, he aligns himself with Onaga in Deception due to Onaga's reputation for preserving order. As part of his alignment, Hotaru pursues Sub-Zero for killing many of Onaga's Tarkatan warriors. In turn, Hotaru is pursued by Dairou, who received a contract to assassinate him. He is depicted being killed by Dairou, Darrius, and Kenshi in their respective endings, but the 2011 reboot reveals that his death occurred during the final battle of Armageddon.

The character was conceived as a foil to Havik. His name is the Japanese word for firefly, which serves as the motif for his costume that was designed by Jennifer Hedrick.

Hotaru was ranked 43rd on UGO's 2012 list of the top 50 Mortal Kombat characters. Ranking him 60th in their 2015 rating of the series' 73 characters, Den of Geek remarked that "order tends to be the more boring [compared to chaos], but Hotaru has just enough of a cool factor". Robert Workman of GamePlayBook rated Hotaru 10th in his selection of the worst series characters for his using lava as a weapon and "stealing" Liu Kang's Bicycle Kick for one of his special moves.

Kira
Voiced by: Christine Rios (MK:A), Courtenay Taylor (MKL:SB)
Kira is a member of the Black Dragon clan who possesses the abilities of Kano and Sonya Blade. She also wields the same daggers as Kano. Formerly an arms dealer, she becomes the first recruit of Kabal's new clan in Deception. Early into the Konquest mode of Armageddon, Kira is seen guarding a bridge alongside Kobra. Kira, however, abandons Kobra during his battle with Taven, which he loses.

John Vogel described Kira as the "most disciplined" of the Black Dragons, while Jay Biondo called her "the Fatal Attraction character". Describing her as an "evil Sonya Blade" who was "a bit easier to take seriously" than Kobra, Den of Geek placed Kira 32nd in their 2015 ranking of the franchise's 64 player characters. Her storyline as an arms dealer who disguised herself as a man was ranked fourth by John Harty of WhatCulture in his 2015 selection of the series' ten "Most Badass Backstories", calling it "a concept that speaks to a person having some serious balls".

Kobra
Voiced by: Alex Brandon (MK:A), Yuri Lowenthal (MKL:SB)Kobra is a martial artist who serves the Black Dragon clan. Once a disciplined fighter, he turns criminal after he starts using his training to kill others. His bloodlust catches the attention of Kabal, who makes him the second recruit of his clan in Deception. Kobra appears as Taven's first opponent in the Konquest mode of  Armageddon, where he unsuccessfully attempts to prevent Taven from crossing a bridge. In Mortal Kombat X, Erron Black claims to have killed him, but this is unconfirmed.

The character was named "Ken Masters" while Deception was in a beta phase of the production due to his physical resemblance to Street Fighter character of the same name. Ed Boon described Kobra in Deception as "the simple character that everybody can pick up and play" with easy-to-execute special moves.

GamePlayBook placed Kobra sixth in their 2010 listing of the 10 worst Mortal Kombat characters, unfavorably comparing him to Ken. He was also ranked as the fifth worst Mortal Kombat character by ScrewAttack, who described him as "a generic white guy". However, Den of Geek rated Kobra 35th in their 2015 ranking of the 64 series characters, calling him an "evil Johnny Cage".

Onaga
Voiced by: Nigel Casey (MK:D, MK:A)
Onaga is the final boss of Deception. Also known as the Dragon King, he was the emperor of Outworld until he was poisoned by Shao Kahn. Resurrected in Deception, Onaga derives his power from the Kamidogu, six mystical relics that contain the essence of each main realm. Unbeknownst to Onaga, however, he is being manipulated by the One Being into unmaking reality through the Kamidogu. The Konquest mode of Deception reveals how he manipulated Shujinko into collecting the Kamidogu for him under the identity of his avatar Damashi. He is ultimately defeated by Shujinko, but returns in Armageddon, where he begrudgingly enters an alliance with Shao Kahn and other major villains to destroy Blaze. Onaga does not appear in the rebooted timeline, although he is occasionally referenced.

The character was ranked 39th on UGO's 2012 list of the top 50 Mortal Kombat fighters.

Shujinko
 Voiced by: Max Crawford (MK:D, MK:A)
Shujinko is a veteran adventurer with the ability to copy the powers of his opponents. He serves as the protagonist of Deceptions Konquest mode, which depicts how he was deceived into collecting the six mystical Kamidogu for Onaga. Upon learning of the deception, Shujinko seeks redemption by using the power he received from Onaga to defeat him. Shujinko emerges victorious by destroying the Kamidogu, but believing that he has not redeemed himself, he plots to destroy Onaga and the other villains during the events of Armageddon. He appears in the Mortal Kombat X prequel comic, where he guards Chaosrealm's Kamidogu, but becomes possessed by Havik.

Ed Boon deemed Shujinko the series' "next-generation Liu Kang", but the character was not well received. Describing him as "one of the most gullible, susceptible dumbasses in video games", Den of Geek placed Shujinko 65th in their 2015 ranking of the series' 73 playable characters. ScrewAttack ranked Shujinko the eighth worst Mortal Kombat character for being an "older and boring" Liu Kang. Bryan Dawson of Prima Games named him one of the series' "cheapest" characters due to his moveset of other fighters' special attacks.

Introduced in Mortal Kombat: Armageddon

Daegon
 Voiced by: Tom Taylorson (MK:A)

Daegon is the younger of the brothers tasked with preventing Armageddon. Due to being awoken prematurely from his incubation, however, he appears physically older than Taven. The premature awakening causes Daegon to become unbalanced, resulting in him killing his parents and forming the Red Dragon clan. When Taven is properly awoken during the events of Armageddon, Daegon fights him for the right to face Blaze, but he is defeated by his older brother. Along with a background cameo in the 2011 reboot, he appears in the Mortal Kombat X prequel comic, which establishes him as the killer of Takeda's mother.

The character was initially called "Doug" during the production of Armageddon as the developers had difficulty finding a name for him. Daegon finished 56th in Den of Geek's 2015 ranking of the series' 73 characters. He was criticized by Hardcore Gaming 101, who opined that his in-development name was "probably the most interesting thing about him".

Taven
 Voiced by: Shaun Himmerick (MK:A)

Taven is the older of the brothers tasked with preventing Armageddon. He serves as the protagonist of Armageddons Konquest mode, which depicts his quest to save the realms by claiming Blaze's power. The mode ends with Taven defeating Blaze, but his victory does not stop the final battle as it instead causes the other warriors to become more powerful. The 2011 reboot, however, established that Shao Kahn claimed Blaze's power, implying that Taven was defeated by Blaze. Taven has not been featured in the storyline of the rebooted timeline, although he has appeared in non-canonical endings.

Due to difficulty in naming the character, Taven was originally called "Bob" until his final name was determined. Ed Boon revealed that he initially opposed Taven's final name before it made "perfect sense" to him. Reception to Taven was mostly negative; Hardcore Gaming 101 called him "utterly generic". Destructoid named him the series' second-worst fighter, describing him as "the most bland character in MK history". Similar criticism was shared by Den of Geek in their 2015 ranking of the series' 73 playable characters, which placed him 58th and opined "Taven's generic design didn't do him any favors" when Armageddon was "based around including every single playable Mortal Kombat character".

Introduced in Mortal Kombat vs. DC Universe

Dark Kahn
 Voiced by: Perry Brown and Patrick Seitz

Dark Kahn is the final boss of Mortal Kombat vs. DC Universe. He is an amalgamation of Shao Kahn and DC Comics supervillain Darkseid, created through the accidental merging of their universes. Deriving his power from conflict, he attempts to fully merge the universes by manipulating the Mortal Kombat and DC warriors into fighting each other. Dark Kahn is ultimately defeated by Raiden and Superman, who manage to overcome his manipulation. Following Dark Kahn's destruction, Shao Kahn and Darkseid become trapped in their counterparts' universe; Darkseid is sent to the Netherrealm, while Shao Kahn is imprisoned in the Phantom Zone.

Introduced in Mortal Kombat (2011)

Skarlet
Voiced by: Beata Poźniak (2019-Present)

Skarlet is a warrior created by Shao Kahn using sorcery and the blood of countless warriors. She debuts in the 2011 series reboot, where her purpose is to discern Quan Chi's true reason for attending the Mortal Kombat tournament. In Mortal Kombat 11, her background is changed to that as an orphan adopted by Shao Kahn to learn blood magic upon her eventual transformation into an imperial bodyguard and assassin. Skarlet uses kodachi swords and kunai knives as well as her power to turn into, and absorb, the blood of her victims, in addition to be able to manipulate her victim's blood. 

Similar to the Ermac rumors in the first Mortal Kombat, Skarlet originated as a nonexistent character in Mortal Kombat II due to false reports of a glitch nicknamed "Scarlet" by players in which the palette swaps of either Kitana or Mileena would turn red. Nearly two decades after the rumors originated, she was announced as one of the 2011 reboot's first downloadable (DLC) playable characters. She plays a minor role in DC Comics' 2015 Mortal Kombat X comic series set before the events of the game, but does not appear in the game itself. Skarlet has been noted by gaming media outlets for the graphic nature of her character and her Fatalities.

Introduced in Mortal Kombat X

Cassie Cage

D'Vorah
 Voiced by: Kelly Hu (MKX, MK11), Debra Wilson (MKL:BOTR)
D'Vorah is a Kytinn, a humanoid race with insect/arachnid traits. Her name is derived from the Hebrew word for bee. She is first seen serving Kotal Kahn in Mortal Kombat X, but is secretly in allegiance with Shinnok, which results in her being defeated by Cassie Cage. In Mortal Kombat 11, D'Vorah joins Kronika's efforts in restarting the timeline. Although she kills the present version of Scorpion, she is forced to retreat after his past counterpart injures her; her subsequent fate is unknown.

D'Vorah appears in the 2021 animated film Mortal Kombat Legends: Battle of the Realms, voiced by Debra Wilson.

The character has received a polarizing reception; Melody MacReady of ScreenRant noted that while D'Vorah is praised for her design, she has generated controversy for killing popular characters Baraka, Mileena, and Scorpion within the story. Nevertheless, she ranked 25th in Den of Geek's 2015 rating of the series' 73 playable characters, which called her "a great new addition to the roster" and lauded that she was "filled with all sorts of creepy surprises".

Erron Black
 Voiced by: Troy Baker
Erron Black is a mercenary from Earthrealm, but in the service of Outworld. Depicted as a 19th-century gunfighter from the Old West, his backstory reveals that his body's aging was slowed by Shang Tsung in exchange for murdering an unidentified Earthrealm warrior. As a result, he utilizes 19th century weaponry. He serves Kotal Kahn in Mortal Kombat X, which puts him into conflict with Earthrealm's warriors. Mortal Kombat 11 features a past version of Erron Black who serves Shao Kahn, while his present counterpart assists Kitana in defeating Shao Kahn's forces.

The character placed 10th in Den of Geek's rating of the series' 73 characters in 2015, the highest of any fighter not introduced in the first three games, which described him as "the Boba Fett of Mortal Kombat".

Ferra/Torr
 Voiced by:  Tara Strong (Ferra); Fred Tatasciore (Torr)
Ferra and Torr are a duo belonging to an Outworld symbiotic species. Through their relationship, the diminutive Ferra rides the massive Torr into battle, while Torr serves as their enforcer. During gameplay, the player controls Torr, with Ferra utilized for special attacks; as such, fatalities and brutalities are performed directly on Torr. Their ending in Mortal Kombat X establishes that Ferra is a juvenile who will be mounted by a rider when she reaches maturity, while Torr dies without her. In the story mode of Mortal Kombat X, Ferra and Torr serve Kotal Kahn, which leads to them fighting Earthrealm's warriors; they are ultimately incapacitated by Sub-Zero.

Ebenezer Samuel of the New York Daily News called Ferra and Torr a "highlight" of the game, with their in-gameplay mannerisms "distracting enough to take your eye off the battle, and quirky enough that it's worth watching." They ranked 39th in the ranking of the series characters by Den of Geek, who praised them as "the most original new race the series has introduced in years".

Jacqui Briggs
 Voiced by:  Danielle Nicolet (MKX); Megalyn Echikunwoke (MK11)
Jacqui Briggs is a Special Forces operative who uses a pair of electronic gauntlets as her primary weapon. The daughter of Jax, she debuts in Mortal Kombat X as a member of Cassie Cage's unit, with whom she helps defeat the threatening forces of Outworld and the Netherrealm. She also becomes the love interest to Takeda. In Mortal Kombat 11, Jacqui and the past version of her father are forced to face the present version of Jax when he aligns himself with Kronika. After the present version realizes his mistakes, she fights alongside both versions of her father in the battle against Kronika's forces.

Den of Geek ranked Jacqui 47th in their ranking of the 73 series characters, praising her for being "fun to play as" while finding that "she doesn't stand out nearly enough". Ikhtear Shahrukh of [[The Daily Star (Bangladesh)|The Daily Star]] opined that Jacqui "fit[s] into typical generic fighter game character stereotypes instead of being Mortal Kombat material".

Kotal Kahn
 Voiced by:  Phil LaMarr (MKX, MK11)
Kotal Kahn is the emperor of Outworld in Mortal Kombat X and Mortal Kombat 11. He is an Osh-Tekk, an Aztec-inspired species whose powers originate from the sun, and wields a macuahuitl as his primary weapon. Embroiled in a civil war against Mileena in Mortal Kombat X, he receives support from the Earthrealm warriors, but turns against them due to D'Vorah's deception. Kotal Kahn later leads an invasion of Earthrealm, which is driven back by the Lin Kuei. In Mortal Kombat 11, his rule is threatened by the return of Shao Kahn. After Shao Kahn cripples him, he names Kitana the new ruler of Outworld. He does not appear during the battle against Kronika in the original story mode, but Aftermath sees him participate after his injures heal; he is killed by Shao Kahn in a surprise attack.

The character was ranked 15th on Den of Geek's list of Mortal Kombat characters, which compared him to Black Adam and Namor as an "honorable" emperor who "will do anything to protect his planetary kingdom".

Kung Jin

Takeda
 Voiced by:  Parry Shen
Takeda is a member of the Shirai Ryu clan whose primary weapon is a pair of bladed whips. The son of Kenshi, he was raised and trained by Scorpion after his mother's murder as Kenshi wanted him properly prepared to avenge his mother. He is depicted as a member of Cassie Cage's unit in Mortal Kombat X, where he helps defeat the threatening forces of Outworld and the Netherrealm. Takeda also serves as the love interest of Jacqui Briggs. Although he does not appear in Mortal Kombat 11, Jacqui mentions that they have become engaged.

The character was ranked 36th in the list of Mortal Kombat characters by Den of Geek, which found that he "works best as an accessory to Scorpion, finally giving him some semblance of family and helping to give him closure".

Triborg
 Voiced by: Vic Chao
Triborg is a cybernetic warrior created from the consciousnesses of Sektor, Cyrax, Smoke, and Sub-Zero.  As a result, he is able to replicate the abilities of each. Depending on the variation selected by the player, Triborg will appear as one of the Lin Kuei cyborgs and utilize his special moves during gameplay. He debuted as a downloadable character in Mortal Kombat X, where his backstory establishes that he seeks to destroy all organic life. However, he has no involvement in the storyline of the game. Triborg was excluded from the Den of Geek ranking of the series' fighters, as writer Gavin Jasper found him to be "a Voltron of existing characters".

Introduced in Mortal Kombat 11

Cetrion
 Voiced by: Mary Elizabeth McGlynn
Cetrion is the Elder Goddess of life and virtue. She utilizes nature and the elements as her primary powers. As the daughter of Kronika and sister of Shinnok, Cetrion is intended to balance the darkness represented by her brother. Despite her benevolent appearance, however, she maintains loyalty to Kronika. This loyalty leads to Cetrion allowing Kronika to absorb her essence in both the original story mode of Mortal Kombat 11 and the Aftermath expansion.

Ranking her 38th in his list of the series' characters, Gavin Jasper of Den of Geek called Cetrion "more nightmarish" than Shinnok.

Geras
 Voiced by: Dave B. Mitchell
Geras is an artificial construct created by Kronika to serve as her primary enforcer. Named after the Greek deity of old age, his powers are based around manipulating sand and time. The story mode of Mortal Kombat 11 establishes that he also possesses regenerative abilities, effectively rendering him immortal. As the Earthrealm heroes are unable to kill him, Raiden defeats Geras by throwing him into Netherrealm's bottomless Sea of Blood. The Aftermath expansion, however, depicts Geras being killed by Shao Kahn, despite his immortality powers.

Gavin Jasper of Den of Geek ranked Geras 20th in his list of the series' characters, with praise for his time manipulation powers and calling his ability to alter the game's match timer "such a wonderful, brilliant asshole move".

Kollector
 Voiced by: Andrew Morgado
Kollector is a Naknadan, a six-armed species in Outworld. His multiple arms allow him to utilize a wide array of weaponry, including a lantern, chain mace, bag bomb, and vials of fire. As implied by his name, he served as tribute collector for Shao Kahn until the emperor's death. When Shao Kahn returns in the story mode of Mortal Kombat 11, Kollector rejoins his forces, but is defeated by Kitana. In the Aftermath expansion, he is the first to notice the time-displaced Shang Tsung, Fujin, and Nightwolf arrive in Outworld, leading to him being defeated by the lattermost.

Ranked 45th in his list of the series' characters, Gavin Jasper of Den of Geek spoke highly of the Kollector's animation and fighting style, but found that "he showed up a little too late to the party".

Kronika
 Voiced by: Jennifer Hale
Kronika is the final boss of Mortal Kombat 11. She is a Titan, a deity predating the Elder Gods, and responsible for maintaining the universe's timeline. As such, her powers center around space and time manipulation. Mortal Kombat 11s story mode depicts her efforts to maintain the conflict between good and evil by restarting the timeline, while also removing Raiden from history. Although Kronika succeeds in bringing the timeline back to its beginning (which erases all the events in the entire franchise from existence), she is destroyed by Fire God Liu Kang, who becomes the new keeper of time. Kronika returns in the Aftermath expansion when Shang Tsung goes back in time to retrieve her crown, which is required to control the timeline. She is ultimately erased from existence by Shang Tsung, while either Shang Tsung or Liu Kang becomes the keeper of time, depending on who the player selects in the battle between them.

Originally developed as a male deity, Kronika is noted as the first female boss in the Mortal Kombat franchise. She was ranked 23rd in the Den of Geek's series characters list, the second-highest final boss behind Shao Kahn, which praised her as "a great major villain" who was "scary not because of her pure might, but because of her affronting divinity".

Other
This character was never featured in games, either because he never existed or were removed during development.

Belokk

Belokk was originally slated for Mortal Kombat Gold but was cut from the final release. He was created by Eurocom and, according to Ed Boon, was removed from the game as the developers did not have time to complete him.  Nevertheless, Eurocom accidentally sent information about the game with Belokk in it to Game Informer, and as a result, six screenshots of him were leaked to the public in a preview, upon special request.

Guest characters
Guest characters from various media franchises have appeared in subsequent Mortal Kombat games following the 2008 crossover title Mortal Kombat vs. DC Universe.

 = Playable in the base roster of the game

 = Playable in later iterations of the game

 = Appears as a non-playable opponent

References

 
Mortal Kombat